Amastus popayanensis is a moth of the family Erebidae. It was described by Rothschild in 1916. It is found in Colombia.

Taxonomy
There is some dispute over whether the species belongs in Amastus or Hemihyalea.

References

Moths described in 1916
popayanensis
Moths of South America